Geoff Robinson (born 14 December 1957), also known by the nickname of "Robbo", is an Australian former professional rugby league footballer who played in the 1970s and 1980s. He played for Canterbury-Bankstown in the New South Wales Rugby League (NSWRL) competition.

Playing career
At 18, Robinson was graded by Canterbury from the Chester Hill Hornets in 1976. He made his first-grade début against Eastern Suburbs on 28 May 1977.

Robinson stood out on the field with his long dark hair, bushy beard and socks around his ankles, he was renowned for his devastating runs at the line.

Robinson is a member of Canterbury-Bankstown's 1980 Premiership winning team in their 18–4 win over Eastern Suburbs and their 1984 Premiership win over Parramatta (6–4).

Robinson played 30 games in all competitions in Halifax's victory in the Championship during the 1985–86 season, before re-joining Canterbury in round 12 of the 1986 NSWRL season.  Robinson played in the 1986 Grand Final for Canterbury against Parramatta in which the club lost 4-2.

Coaching career
After retiring from first-grade at the end of 1986, Robinson went on to coach the Canterbury U-23 side to a premiership in 1991. Robinson was involved with the now defunct Chester Hill Rhinos, as coach, in the Jim Beam Cup from 2007-2009.

Footnotes

References

External links
Geoff Robinson at the Rugby League Project
Geoff Robinson at NRL Stats
Geoff Robinson at the Bulldogs

1957 births
Australian rugby league players
Australian rugby league coaches
Canterbury-Bankstown Bulldogs players
Halifax R.L.F.C. players
Living people
Rugby league second-rows
Rugby league props
Rugby league players from Sydney